Bob and the Monster is a 2011 documentary film by Keirda Bahruth which profiles musician and drug counselor Bob Forrest.

Synopsis 
This documentary film follows outspoken indie-rock hero Bob Forrest, through his life-threatening struggle with addiction, to his transformation into one of the most influential and controversial drug counselors in the US today. Bob and the Monster crafts contemporary footage, animation and compelling interviews with archival performances and personal videos from Bob's past to reveal the complex layers of this troubled, but hopeful soul.

The trailer made its debut online on February 18, 2011. The film had its world premiere at the 2011 SXSW festival.

Bob and The Monster has played Nashville Film Festival, CIMMFest (WINNER Best Documentary), HotDocs, Gold Coast International Film Festival (WINNER Audience Award Best Documentary, WINNER Best Trailer), Sheffield Doc/Fest and AFI/Discovery Channel Silverdocs.

The documentary was released on DVD and digitally in the United States on September 3, 2013 and according to the Facebook page there were special giveaways and video messages by Forrest leading up to the release date.

Cast 
 Bob Forrest
 Thelonious Monster
 Anthony Kiedis
 Flea
 John Frusciante
 Courtney Love
 Angelo Moore
 John Norwood Fisher
 Stephen Perkins
 Eric Avery
 Keith Morris
 Brett Gurewitz
 Scott Weiland
 Gibby Haynes
 Steven Adler
 Martyn LeNoble
 Zander Schloss
 Drew Pinsky
 David Adelson
 Elijah Forrest
 Iris Berry

Awards 

Bob and The Monster received the Audience Award for Best Documentary at the 2011 Gold Coast International Film Festival.  The film also won the Jury Award Best Documentary at the 2011 Chicago International Movies and Music Festival.

References

External links 
 
 
 
 
 Review in The Hollywood Reporter
 Interview in the Maclean's

2011 films
2011 documentary films
American documentary films
Documentary films about rock music and musicians
Documentary films about drug addiction
2010s English-language films
2010s American films